Brian Natkin (born January 3, 1978) is an American football coach and former tight end who is the assistant offensive line coach for the Arizona Cardinals of the National Football League (NFL). He previously served as an assistant coach at Hutchinson Community College, University of Texas at El Paso (UTEP), Midwestern State University and University of Northern Colorado.

Natkin played college football at the University of Texas at El Paso (UTEP), where he was a consensus selection to the 2000 College Football All-America Team. He played in the NFL for the Tennessee Titans and St. Louis Rams.

Playing career

College
During the 2000 NCAA Division I-A football season, Natkin lead tight ends nationally with 64 catches for 787 yards.  Natkin was a unanimous selection to the 2000 College Football All-America Team, the only ever UTEP player to earn unanimous All-American honors in football.  For his college career Natkin had 172 receptions for 1,934 yards and was a three-time first-team All-WAC selection (1998-2000).

NFL
Natkin played three games for the Tennessee Titans of the National Football League (NFL) in 2001, starting one game.  Natkin spent the 2003 pre-season with the St. Louis Rams.

Coaching career

College
From 2004 to 2005, Natkin was a graduate assistant at UTEP after graduating in 2003.  In 2006, Natkin was an assistant coach at the University of Northern Colorado.  From 2007 to 2011, Natkin was an assistant coach at Midwestern State University.  From 2012 to 2017, Natkin was the tight ends coach and recruiting coordinator at UTEP.

National Football League

Arizona Cardinals
On January 13, 2019, Natkin was hired by the Arizona Cardinals  of the NFL to be their assistant offensive line coach.

References

External links
 Arizona Cardinals bio

1978 births
Living people
American football tight ends
Arizona Cardinals coaches
Hutchinson Blue Dragons football coaches
Midwestern State Mustangs football coaches
Northern Colorado Bears football coaches
Tennessee Titans players
UTEP Miners football coaches
UTEP Miners football players
All-American college football players
Sportspeople from San Antonio
Players of American football from San Antonio